Jean-Xavier Lefèvre (Lausanne Cressis, 6 March 1763 – Paris Neuilly, 9 November 1829) was a Swiss-born French clarinettist and composer.

In 1778, at the age of 15, Lefèvre became a member of the French Guards band. When the National Guard was formed in the year of the Revolution he played in this and from 1790 was its deputy conductor. In 1814 he was made a Chevalier of the Legion of Honor. He had many famous pupils at the Paris Conservatoire who included Janssen 1795/6, Péchignier 1797, Crusell 1803, Buteux 1814 to 1819, Crépin 1816 to 1821, Adolphe Hugot 1817 to 1822 and Pierre Hugot 1820 to 1824. He may also have taught Dacosta in 1797 and 1798, but some authorities say Duvernoy did. Very many of Lefèvre's pupils gained First Prizes. Up to the year 1817 a First Prize carried with it the award of a pair of French-made clarinets in B flat and C. From 1818 to 1892 the Prize was of music worth 100 francs. During Lefèvre's term of office the contest piece had always to be the composition of the professor and Sainsbury mentions that in 1799 Lefèvre set his Concerto no.5. Early Conservatoire records are unfortunately incomplete and the only year listed in these is 1824, Lefèvre's last year as professor, when he set Ms Concerto no.3. Compuso 12 sonatas.

Works for band 
 1795: Hymn for mixed choir and band
 1796: Hymne à l'agriculture pour la fête de l'agriculture célébrée le 28 juin for mixed choir and band

Pedagogical works 
 1802: Méthode de clarinette
 Soixante exercices pour clarinette

Discography 
 Eduard Brunner; Tudor 7098; © 2002, (p) 2002
 Concerto for clarinet and orchestra no.3 in E-flat major
 Concerto for clarinet and orchestra no.4 in B-flat major
 Concerto for clarinet and orchestra no.6 in B-flat major
 Jacques Lancelot; King Records Firebird KICC 66 © 1992 (p) 1976
 Rondo from the Sonata for clarinet and Piano (ciphered bass)

References

External links
 

1763 births
1829 deaths
18th-century French composers
18th-century male musicians
19th-century French composers
French classical composers
French classical clarinetists
Swiss clarinetists
Swiss male musicians
Burials at Père Lachaise Cemetery
Chevaliers of the Légion d'honneur

19th-century male musicians